Leonard Scott (born January 19, 1980) was an American sprinter mainly competing in the 100 meters event.  Scott attended the University of Tennessee on a track scholarship and turned professional in 2002. In 2005 he joined the exclusive list of sprinters to run the 100 in less than 10 seconds. A month later he finished sixth at the 2005 World Championships. Having overcome eventual silver medal winner Michael Frater in the semifinal, he had been among the medal favorites.

In 2006 he won at the World Indoor Championships in Moscow, clocking a world leading time of 6.50 seconds in the 60 meters. He also finished second in the World Athletics Final that year, with a personal best of 9.91 seconds.

Personal bests

All information from IAAF Profile.

References

External links

USATF profile for Leonard Scott

1980 births
Living people
American male sprinters
People from Zachary, Louisiana
Track and field athletes from Louisiana
World Athletics Championships athletes for the United States
World Athletics Indoor Championships winners
Tennessee Volunteers men's track and field athletes
Tennessee Volunteers football players
USA Indoor Track and Field Championships winners
Sportspeople from East Baton Rouge Parish, Louisiana